Halgera is a panchayat village in the southern state of Karnataka, India. Administratively, Halgera is under Yadgir Taluka of Yadgir District in Karnataka.  The village of Halgera is 14 km by road southeast of the town of Yadgir and 6 km by road northeast of the village of Zinkera.  The nearest railhead is in Yadgir.

There are three villages in the gram panchayat: Halgera, Maskehhalli, and Raisabad Hosahalli.

Demographics 
 census, the village of Halgera had 2,471 inhabitants, with 1,272 males and 1,199 females.

Notes

External links 
 

Villages in Yadgir district